Ust-Volchikha is a rural locality (a selo) and the administrative center of Ust-Volchikhinsky Selsoviet, Volchikhinsky District, Altai Krai, Russia. The population was 941 as of 2013. It was founded in 1812. There are 9 streets.

Geography 
Ust-Volchikha is located 17 km southwest of Volchikha (the district's administrative centre) by road. Bor-Forpost is the nearest rural locality.

References 

Rural localities in Volchikhinsky District